Kumamoto earthquake may refer to:

1889 Kumamoto earthquake
2016 Kumamoto earthquakes

See also
List of earthquakes in Japan